Arturo Miranda (born January 19, 1971) is a Canadian national team diving coach and former diver. Miranda coaches Olympians Meaghan Benfeito, Roseline Filion, and Jennifer Abel at the Pointe-Claire Diving Club with Li Yihua.

Miranda finished in fifth in the synchronized 3m springboard event at the 2008 Summer Olympics in Beijing with former world champion Alexandre Despatie. He was born in Havana, Cuba.

References

External links 
 Diving Plongeon Canada

1971 births
Living people
Cuban emigrants to Canada
Divers from Montreal
Divers at the 2007 Pan American Games
Divers at the 2008 Summer Olympics
Naturalized citizens of Canada
Olympic divers of Canada
Sportspeople from Havana
Canadian male divers
World Aquatics Championships medalists in diving
Pan American Games bronze medalists for Canada
Commonwealth Games medallists in diving
Commonwealth Games gold medallists for Canada
Pan American Games medalists in diving
Divers at the 2003 Pan American Games
Divers at the 2006 Commonwealth Games
Medalists at the 2007 Pan American Games
Medallists at the 2006 Commonwealth Games